Elliston is a census-designated place (CDP) in Powell County, Montana, United States. The population was 225 at the 2000 census.

The town is most likely named after Northern Pacific Railroad director John W. Ellis. By the mid-1880s, Elliston was flourishing as a center for gold and quartz mining.

Geography
Elliston is located at  (46.567089, -112.444965).

Climate
This climatic region is typified by large seasonal temperature differences, with warm to hot (and often humid) summers and cold (sometimes severely cold) winters.  According to the Köppen Climate Classification system, Elliston has a humid continental climate, abbreviated "Dfb" on climate maps.

Demographics

As of the census of 2000, there were 225 people, 89 households, and 64 families residing in the CDP. The population density was 25.6 people per square mile (9.9/km2). There were 104 housing units at an average density of 11.8 per square mile (4.6/km2). The racial makeup of the CDP was 98.22% White, 0.89% Native American, 0.44% Asian, and 0.44% from two or more races.

There were 89 households, out of which 41.6% had children under the age of 18 living with them, 57.3% were married couples living together, 11.2% had a female householder with no husband present, and 27.0% were non-families. 22.5% of all households were made up of individuals, and 12.4% had someone living alone who was 65 years of age or older. The average household size was 2.53 and the average family size was 2.94.

In the CDP, the population was spread out, with 32.0% under the age of 18, 2.7% from 18 to 24, 28.0% from 25 to 44, 23.6% from 45 to 64, and 13.8% who were 65 years of age or older. The median age was 36 years. For every 100 females, there were 94.0 males. For every 100 females age 18 and over, there were 96.2 males.

The median income for a household in the CDP was $31,964, and the median income for a family was $38,333. Males had a median income of $33,750 versus $21,875 for females. The per capita income for the CDP was $16,501. About 7.6% of families and 10.4% of the population were below the poverty line, including 13.0% of those under the age of eighteen and 6.5% of those 65 or over.

References

Census-designated places in Powell County, Montana
Census-designated places in Montana